The flutter kick is a kicking movement used in both swimming and calisthenics.

Swimming

In swimming strokes such as the front crawl or backstroke, the primary purpose of the flutter kick is not propulsion but keeping the legs up and in the shadow for the upper body and assisting body rotation for arm strokes. The legs are extended straight backwards in line with the body. They are moved up and down, one leg kicking downwards (relative to the front of the swimmer's body) as the other leg moves up. The knees are slightly bent to facilitate the kicking action, but not too much in order to minimise drag created by the thighs as they move out of the shadow of the swimmer's body. Similarly, toes are pointed to minimize drag.

The downward moving leg provides the thrust. An integral part of the kick is the flexing of the ankles; it is the flexing of the ankle that allows the foot to provide thrust. The knees are not kept rigid when kicking but are allowed to flex slightly to allow the required "snapping" action through the end of the toes.

Underwater diving
The flutter kick used with swimfins can be a powerful propulsion technique, and is used by scuba divers and freedivers underwater and at the surface, but there are other finning techniques more appropriate to some underwater environments and some types of fin. Divers in a confined environment or where silting may be a problem may use a modified flutter kick or frog kick, done entirely with bent knees, pushing water up and behind the diver to avoid stirring up sediment on the bottom.

Calisthenics
The calisthenics version of the flutter kick is often used as an intensive training tool in the military. They help to develop the hip flexors, abdominal muscles and leg muscles. Flutter kicks are a four-count exercise. Starting position is lying flat on the back with the feet and head approximately 6 inches (15 cm) off the ground. Hands are under the buttocks to support the lower back. Count one: raise the left leg to a 45-degree angle, keeping the right leg stationary. Count two: raise the right leg off the ground to a 45-degree angle while, at the same time, moving the left leg to the starting position. Counts three and four are repetitions of the same movements. Legs must be locked, with toes pointing away from the body.

References

Swimming styles